Samuel Match (January 3, 1923 – January 23, 2010) was an American tennis player. He was born in Los Angeles, California.

Match was ranked among the top ten amateur players in the United States in 1948, 1949, and 1950 in both singles and doubles play. Lawn Tennis and Badminton magazine ranked him as the 12th-best professional player for the year 1955.

Early life
Match was born in Los Angeles, California, and was Jewish. He attended Los Angeles High School.

Career

He was the California state junior champion at age 18.

He was a radio operator for three years in the United States Army Air Corps while in Guam, and played and lost to Bobby Riggs in the finals of the Army-Navy Championships in 1945.

In 1947, playing doubles for Rice University, Match along with his doubles partner Bob Curtis beat Herbert Flam and Gene Garrett of UCLA 6–4, 8–10, 3–6, 6–2, 7–5 to win the NCAA doubles title.

Match twice defeated US No. 1, Pancho Gonzales.  The first time was 1948 at Newport, Rhode Island, and the second time was in 1949 at River Oaks in Houston.  He was a terrific player with classic groundstrokes.

As an amateur, Match won at La Jolla, California, on February 16, 1948; at Philadelphia in 1948; and at the Utah State Open in 1948 and 1949.

In 1949, playing for the University of San Francisco, Jack Tiero of Tulane beat Match in five sets in the finals of the NCAA tournament. Match and Art Larsen lost the doubles championship in the finals.

Match was the runner-up in La Jolla (March 19, 1950), the California State in San Francisco (May 21, 1950), the Colorado State in Denver (June 9, 1950), and in Salt Lake City (July 2, 1950).

Match's first appearance in a professional tournament was at the California State Pro in Beverly Hills, California (August 11–16, 1953).

Accolades
Match was inducted into the University of San Francisco Athletic Hall of Fame.

In 1991, Match was inducted into the Rice Athletic Hall of Fame.

Match was inducted in 2000 into the Southern California Jewish Sports Hall of Fame.

In 2005, he was honored as one of the University of San Francisco's 75 greatest athletic legends.

See also
List of select Jewish tennis players

References

External links
Jews in Sports bio

1923 births
2010 deaths
American male tennis players
Jewish American sportspeople
Jewish tennis players
Tennis players from Los Angeles
Rice Owls men's tennis players
San Francisco Dons men's tennis players
21st-century American Jews
Professional tennis players before the Open Era